Arvine Heights Historic District is a national historic district located at Rochester, Monroe County, New York.  The district encompasses 61 contributing buildings (37 residences) in an exclusively residential section of Rochester.   The district developed between about 1920 and 1942, and includes residential buildings in a variety of architectural styles including Colonial Revival, Tudor Revival, and Bungalow / American Craftsman.  The dwellings reflect modest designs directed toward a middle-class clientele in a newly developing area of Rochester's Nineteenth Ward.

It was listed on the National Register of Historic Places in 2015.

See also
 National Register of Historic Places listings in Rochester, New York

References

External links

Historic districts on the National Register of Historic Places in New York (state)
Houses on the National Register of Historic Places in New York (state)
Colonial Revival architecture in New York (state)
Tudor Revival architecture in New York (state)
Historic districts in Rochester, New York
National Register of Historic Places in Rochester, New York